Green Cove Springs is  a city in and the county seat of Clay County, Florida, United States. The population was 9,555 at the 2020 census. In 2021, the population increased to 9,784.  Green Cove Springs is a part of the Jacksonville Metropolitan Area, home to 1,637,666 residents.

The city is named after the portion of the St. Johns River upon which it is built. The river bends here, and the area is sheltered by trees that are perennially green.

History 

The area was first inhabited over 7,000 years ago by Native Americans by the warm mineral spring. The hydrological spring of the same name, locally known as the "Original Fountain of Youth", attracted guests in the 19th century;  more than a dozen hotels were near the spring. Today, the sulfur-scented spring water feeds an adjacent public swimming pool before flowing the short distance to the St. Johns River. The Green Cove Springs area was first developed by George J. F. Clarke in 1816 when he was provided land, under a Spanish land grant, to build a sawmill. Green Cove Springs was established in 1854 as White Sulfur Springs. Renamed in 1866, it became the Clay County seat in 1871.

Agriculture and tourism were two of the primary economic ventures until the end of the 19th century, when Henry Flagler's railroad began taking tourists further south into Florida. In 1895, the Great Freeze destroyed the area's citrus crops, and tourism all but ended. The 1920s had renewed development, with automobile traffic bringing in tourists again. The Great Depression of the 1930s was the end of growth again for the city.

The first women's club in the state of Florida was established in Green Cove Springs in 1883. The Village Improvement Association led local efforts to beautify the town, and established its first public library.

The period immediately before and during World War II again brought new growth to Green Cove Springs. On September 11, 1940, the U.S. Navy opened Naval Air Station Lee Field in honor of Ensign Bejamin Lee, who had lost his life in a crash at Killinghome, England, during World War I. In August 1943, the facility was renamed Naval Air Station Green Cove Springs and consisted of four  asphalt runways.  One of the Marine Corps aviators training in the F4U Corsair Operational Training Unit at Lee Field in early 1945 was eventual television personality Ed McMahon.  After the war, NAS Green Cove Springs was downgraded in status to a Naval Auxiliary Air Station  (NAAS) as part of the greater NAS Jacksonville complex. Thirteen piers were constructed along the west bank of the St. Johns River adjacent to NAAS Green Cove Springs to house a U.S. Navy Atlantic Reserve Fleet, Florida "mothball fleet" of some 500 vessels, primarily destroyers, destroyer escorts, and fleet auxiliaries. In 1960, the Navy decommissioned NAAS Green Cove Springs and the pier facility. Some of the mothballed vessels were transferred to foreign navies, while others were relocated to other Reserve Fleet locations.

In 1984, the city annexed the former naval base into the city to use it for further growth and development as the Clay County Port and Reynolds Industrial Park. The air station is now a private airfield known as Reynolds Airpark (FAA airfield identifier FL60) with a single  asphalt runway currently operational, although reportedly in poor condition. Though the original air traffic control tower is still standing, attached to one of the former Navy aircraft hangars, the airfield remains an uncontrolled facility.

Green Cove Springs is the birthplace of Charles E. Merrill (1885–1956), one of the founders of Merrill Lynch. The town's spring is described by his son James Merrill in the poem "Two From Florida", published in The Inner Room (1988).

Green Cove Springs is also the birthplace of Augusta Savage (née Augusta Christine Fells, February 29, 1892 – March 26, 1962). Savage was an African-American sculptor associated with the Harlem Renaissance.

Locally, the community is known as the home of Gustafson's Farm, a brand name of milk and dairy products sold throughout Florida. The main Gustafson Dairy Farm is located in Green Cove Springs and is one of the largest privately owned dairy farms in the Southeastern United States. Started in 1908, the main farm occupies nearly  adjacent to the city limits. Gustafson's has many bottling plants across the state, stretching from Tallahassee in the west to Tampa and Cocoa in the south. All Gustafson products have the picture of the husband-and-wife founders, Frank and Agnes Gustafson (also known as Mama and Papa Gus), who along with their first cow on their farm (named "Buttercup") are prominently featured on the packaging of the dairy's products.

Scenes for the 1971 "B" monster movie Blood Waters of Dr. Z (or Zaat) were filmed here. The movie was satirized on the television program Mystery Science Theater 3000.

Historic places 
These sites are listed on the National Register of Historic Places:
 Clay County Courthouse
 Green Cove Springs Historic District
 St. Mary's Church
 “The Hellhouse” original rehearsal studio to Lynyrd Skynyrd

Government

The city of Green Cove Springs is structured in a city council/city manager form of government, with the council functioning as the governing body. The city has had this form of government since the 1980 charter revision.  The city council is composed of five members who are elected at large to three-year terms. The five-member council consists of the mayor, the vice mayor, and three council members. The mayor and vice mayor are elected by the council and serve in these positions for one year. As the official representative of the city, the mayor is responsible for all intergovernmental relations and for presiding over all meetings of the council. The vice mayor serves as the presiding officer for all council meetings in the mayor's absence. The current city manager is Steve Kennedy.

The current office holders are:

 Mayor - Matt Johnson
 Vice Mayor - Connie Butler
 City Council Seat 1 - Edward Gaw
 City Council Seat 4 - Thomas Smith
 City Council Seat 5 - Steven Kelly

The Green Cove Springs Police Department provides full law enforcement services within the incorporated city limits of Green Cove Springs. The agency is headed by a chief of police with two lieutenants acting as division commanders. The department currently consists of 29 sworn officers, part-time and full-time dispatchers, an evidence custodian, an administrative secretary, and two crossing guards. The agency has full-time officers assigned to the countywide Drug Task Force and Jacksonville Metro DEA Task Force, and also participates in the Clay County SWAT team. In addition to these specialized assignments, the police department is active in the North East Florida Intelligence Unit, North East Florida Burglary Detectives Unit, Northeast Florida Investigative Support Center, the Violent Crime Regional Coordinating Team, Sex Assault Task Force, and Domestic Violence Task Force.  
 
The department serves a diverse community and handled approximately 32,974 calls for service in 2011, with an average response time of two minutes for calls of an emergency nature. The department makes use of mobile data terminals  in all of their patrol vehicles for reporting and obtaining information on the streets. All officers receive advanced training in law enforcement, as well as career development.
 
In 2011, the police department became the first law enforcement agency in northeast Florida to use red-light cameras. The agency is also known for programs such as North East Florida Camp Cadet and the Teen Summit.

In April 2014, the agency moved into a newly built police station and emergency operations center at 1001 Idlewild Avenue.

The city of Green Cove Springs contracts with the Clay County Fire-Rescue Department for fire and medical services.

Post office

A U.S. post office was established at Hibernia on June 19, 1849, but its name was changed on October 17, 1853, to Magnolia Mills, and on July 30, 1866, it was changed to Green Cove Springs. The Hibernia post office was reestablished on February 16, 1855, and remained open until May 15, 1931, when it was closed and the area assigned to Green Cove Springs.

Geography

Green Cove Springs is located on the eastern border of Clay County at  (29.992716, –81.683786), along the St. Johns River.

U.S. Route 17 passes through the center of town as Orange Avenue and leads north  to downtown Jacksonville and south  to Palatka. State Road 16 departs west from the center of the city and leads  to Starke. SR 16 leaves eastbound from US 17 south of the city center and crosses the St. Johns River by the Shands Bridge, leading to St. Augustine  to the east. By the late 2020s, the First Coast Expressway, a major toll bypass road connecting I-10 and I-95, is expected to pass to the west and south of Green Cove Springs.

Demographics

As of the census of 2010,  6,908 people, 1,987 households, and 1,402 families were residing in the city. The 2,199 housing units averaged 322.6 per square mile (124.5/km2). The racial makeup of the city was 71.55% White, 24.40% African American], 0.41% Native American, 0.54% Asian  1.38% from other races, and 1.73% from two or more races. Hispanics or Latinos of any race were 5.08% of the population.

Of the 1,987 households,  28.9% had children under the age of 18 living with them, 50.2% were married couples living together, 16.2% had a female householder with no husband present, and 29.4% were not families. About 24.8% of all households were made up of individuals, and 12.3% had someone living alone who was 65 years of age or older.  The average household size was 2.51, and the average family size was 2.96.

In the city, the population distribution was 23.7% under the age of 18, 8.1% from 18 to 24, 26.0% from 25 to 44, 25.0% from 45 to 64, and 17.2% who were 65 years of age or older.  The median age was 40 years. For every 100 females, there were 98.8 males.  For every 100 females age 18 and over, there were 98.3 males.

The median income for a household in the city was $33,487, and for a family was $40,443. Males had a median income of $28,097 versus $22,040 for females. The per capita income for the city was $17,673.  About 14.6% of families and 19.1% of the population were below the poverty line, including 30.2% of those under age 18 and 13.7% of those age 65 or over.

Education
Green Cove Springs is part of the Clay County School District. The city is home to Charles E. Bennett Elementary School, Green Cove Springs Jr. High School, and the Bannerman Learning Center. Clay High School lies just feet outside of the western city limits.

Notable people

 Cliff Avril (born 1986), player in the National Football League
 Charles Thomas Butler (1906–1964), Major League Baseball pitcher
 Frank J. Canova Jr. (born 1956), electronics engineer, known for inventing the smartphone
 Caeleb Dressel (born 1996), swimmer and seven-time Olympic gold medalist
 Will Holden (born 1993), player in the National Football League
 Charles E. Merrill (1885–1956), American businessman and philanthropist
 Maxey Dell Moody Jr. (1913–1987), founder of MOBRO Marine, Inc.
 Augusta Fells Savage (1892–1962), sculptor and art educator, leader during the Harlem Renaissance of the 1920s
 Jacob Deel (born 2005), Winner of bassmaster classic high school 2022 
 Parker Stalvey (born 2005), Winner of bassmaster classic high school 2022

Museums 
 Clay County Historical Society Museum 
 Military Museum of North Florida

References

External links

 
Cities in Florida
Cities in Clay County, Florida
County seats in Florida
Populated places on the St. Johns River
Cities in the Jacksonville metropolitan area
Springs of Florida
Bodies of water of Clay County, Florida
1854 establishments in Florida
Populated places established in 1854